Kelvin John Morgan (born 14 November 1997) is a Gibraltarian footballer who plays as a forward for Gibraltarian club St Joseph's and the Gibraltar national team.

International career
Morgan made his international debut for Gibraltar on 4 June 2021 against Slovenia.

References

1997 births
Living people
Gibraltarian footballers
Association football forwards
Europa F.C. players
F.C. Bruno's Magpies players
Manchester 62 F.C. players
Mons Calpe S.C. players
Gibraltar Premier Division players
Gibraltar international footballers
Gibraltar National League players
St Joseph's F.C. players